Petrochirus is a genus of hermit crabs of the family Diogenidae. There are seven described species of the genus. The genus was described by William Stimpson in 1858.

References

Crustaceans described in 1858
Taxa named by William Stimpson
Diogenidae
Hermit crabs